Woman with Mirror is a 1987 bronze sculpture in Madrid, Spain, by the Colombian sculptor Fernando Botero. The  sculpture is of a nude woman with a large figure lying on her front; this body shape is a trademark of the sculptor.

In May 1994, an exhibition of Botero's works began in Madrid; by September, it had attracted two million visitors. A survey was taken by the sponsor, Caja Madrid, in which the most voted sculpture would be gifted for public exhibition in the city. Woman with Mirror was the most voted sculpture.

After being gifted to the city, the sculpture was installed on the Calle de Génova, near the entrance to the Plaza de Colón. By April 1995, two more of Botero's Madrid exhibits were on public display: The Hand (bought by Telefónica), and Raptio of Europa at Madrid–Barajas Airport.

References

Bronze sculptures in Spain
Sculptures of women in Spain
Outdoor sculptures in Madrid
1987 sculptures
Mirrors in art